Milltown, Tennessee is an unincorporated community in Marshall County, Tennessee, United States.

It is the location of, or nearest community to, Lillard's Mill Hydroelectric Station, at McLean Rd. and Duck River, which is listed on the National Register of Historic Places.

References

Unincorporated communities in Marshall County, Tennessee
Unincorporated communities in Tennessee